The year 1653 in science and technology involved some significant events.

Biology
Jan van Kessel paints a series of pictures of insects and fruit.

Mathematics
 Blaise Pascal publishes his Traité du triangle arithmétique in which he describes a convenient tabular presentation for binomial coefficients, now called Pascal's triangle.

Physics
 Blaise Pascal publishes his Treatise on the Equilibrium of Liquids in which he explains his law of pressure.

Births
 January 16 – Johann Conrad Brunner, Swiss anatomist (died 1727)
 March 24 – Joseph Sauveur, French mathematician and acoustician (died 1716)

Deaths
 Jan Stampioen, Dutch mathematician (born 1610) (gunpowder explosion)

References

 
17th century in science
1650s in science